Smorz is a breakfast cereal manufactured by the Kellogg Company, consisting of chocolate graham-flavored corn puffs and marshmallows, modeled after the flavor of s'mores. The breakfast cereal was first released in 2003, but was discontinued in December 2013. It was announced in December 2015 that Smorz would be reintroduced, and it was re-discontinued in April 2019.

On December 15, 2020, It has been confirmed that Smorz will return again, according to Candy Hunting's Instagram post.

This cereal is described on the box as a "rich chocolatey graham cereal with marshmallows". The marshmallows are brown and white, and intended to look like chocolate had been swirled into them.

At the height of production, thousands of pounds of chocolate cream and marshmallows were used each day to make Kellogg's Smorz.

References

External links
 Kellogg's Smorz breakfast cereal review at popcultmag.com

Kellogg's cereals
Products introduced in 2003